Scopula poliodesma is a moth of the  family Geometridae. It is found in Australia.

References

Moths described in 1908
poliodesma
Moths of Australia